Veinteañero a los 40 (lit: Young at 40) is a Chilean television series produced and broadcast by Canal 13 since January 3 to July 26, 2016. It stars Francisco Pérez-Bannen, Tamara Acosta, Pablo Macaya, Silvia Santelices, Fernanda Urrejola, Karla Melo and Catalina Guerra, along with Alejandro Trejo, Luis Gnecco and Patricia López.

Cast

Main characters 
 Francisco Pérez-Bannen as Francisco Javier Bustamante Lynch (alias Pancho).
 Max Salgado as young Francisco Bustamante.
 Tamara Acosta as Rafaela Guerra Peñafiel (alias Rafa).
 Katherine Muñoz as young Rafaela Guerra.
 Pablo Macaya as Alejandro Toro (alias Jano).
 Matías Burgos as young Alejandro Toro.
 Fernanda Urrejola as Katia Jorquera.

Supporting characters 
Related to Bustamante family
 Silvia Santelices as Ester Lynch de Bustamante.
 Sigrid Alegría as Fátima Bustamante Lynch de Garcés.
 Néstor Cantillana as Eliseo Garcés Fuentealba.
 Catalina Castelblanco as Isidora Garcés Bustamante.
 Catalina Benítez as Agustina Garcés Bustamante.
 Patricia López as Janín Díaz.
 Lux Pascal as Valentín.

Related to Alejandro and Rafaela family
 Hernán Contreras as Gabriel Toro-Bustamante Guerra (alias Gabo).
 Jaime Artus as Bastian Toro-Bustamante Guerra.
 Alejandro Trejo as Alberto Guerra (alias Tito).
 Catalina Guerra as Cynthia Mercedes Espinoza.
 Rocío Toscano as young Cynthia Espinoza.
 Catalina González as Virginia.
 Claudio Castellón as Jonathan Cubillos (alias Palanca).
 Andrés Commentz as Tomás Toro Basáez (alias Tommy).
 Constanza Piccoli as Nicole Basáez.
 Karla Melo as Alison Mercedes Espinoza.
 Katyna Huberman as Jackie Munita.

Related to Cristián Grez company
 Luis Gnecco as Cristián Grez.
 Ariel Levy as Oliver Grez.
 Daniela Nicolás as Gracia Montero Rojas.
 Aída Escuredo as Maya Zulueta.

Guest appearances 
 Yann Yvin as himself.
 Consuelo Holzapfel as Abbess.
 Cristián Campos as Raúl Bustamante.
 Liliana García as M.D. Sara Parker.
 Gabriela Medina as Violeta.
 Nissim Sharim as Francoise.
 John Serrano as Shakiro.

Reception

Television ratings

International broadcast 
 Ecuador: Telerama (2016).

References

External links 
  

2016 telenovelas
Chilean telenovelas
Canal 13 (Chilean TV channel) telenovelas
2016 Chilean television series debuts
2016 Chilean television series endings
Spanish-language telenovelas
Television shows set in Santiago